The Chimes: A Goblin Story of Some Bells that Rang an Old Year Out and a New Year In, commonly referred to as The Chimes, is a novella written by Charles Dickens and first published in 1844, one year after A Christmas Carol. It is the second in his series of "Christmas books," five novellas with strong social and moral messages that he published during the 1840s. In addition to A Christmas Carol and The Chimes, the Christmas books include The Cricket on the Hearth (1845), The Battle of Life (1846), and The Haunted Man and the Ghost's Bargain (1848).

Development history
The book was written in late 1844, during Dickens's year-long visit to Italy.  John Forster, his first biographer, records that Dickens, hunting for a title and structure for his next contracted Christmas story, was struck one day by the clamour of the Genoese bells audible from the villa where they were staying.

Two days later Forster received a letter from Dickens which read simply: ""We have heard THE CHIMES at midnight, Master Shallow!", and the writing of the book began. Forster describes Dickens's intentions in writing The Chimes as striking "a blow for the poor".   
Dickens returned to London for a week in December 1844 and gave readings of the finished book to friends prior to publication, to judge its impact. The artist Daniel Maclise, who had contributed two illustrations to The Chimes and attended two of these events, portrayed the reading of 3 December 1844 in a well-known sketch.

Explanation of the novel's title
The chimes are old bells in the church on whose steps Trotty Veck plies his trade. The book is divided into four parts named "quarters", after the quarter chimes of a striking clock. (This parallels Dickens naming the parts of A Christmas Carol "staves" – that is "stanzas" – and dividing The Cricket on the Hearth into "chirps".)

Plot summary
On New Year's Eve, Trotty, a poor elderly "ticket-porter" or casual messenger, is filled with gloom at the reports of crime and immorality in the newspapers, and wonders whether the working classes are simply wicked by nature. His daughter Meg and her long-time fiancé Richard arrive and announce their decision to marry next day. Trotty hides his misgivings, but their happiness is dispelled by an encounter with the pompous Alderman Cute, plus a political economist and a young gentleman with a nostalgia, all of whom make Trotty, Meg and Richard feel they hardly have a right to exist, let alone marry.

Trotty carries a note for Cute to Sir Joseph Bowley MP, who dispenses charity to the poor in the manner of a paternal dictator. Bowley is ostentatiously settling his debts to ensure a clean start to the new year, and berates Trotty because he owes a little rent and ten or twelve shillings to his local shop which he cannot pay off. Returning home, convinced that he and his fellow poor are naturally ungrateful and have no place in society, Trotty encounters Will Fern, a poor countryman, and his orphaned niece, Lilian. Fern has been accused of vagrancy and wants to visit Cute to set matters straight, but from a conversation overheard at Bowley's house, Trotty is able to warn him that Cute plans to have him arrested and imprisoned. He takes the pair home with him and he and Meg share their meagre food and poor lodging with the visitors. Meg tries to hide her distress, but it seems she has been dissuaded from marrying Richard by her encounter with Cute and the others. When the others have gone to bed, Trotty sits up with a newspaper and is reinforced in his belief that the poor are naturally wicked by reading of a mother who has drowned herself and her baby.

In the night, the bells seem to call Trotty. Going to the church, he finds the tower door unlocked and climbs to the bellchamber, where he discovers the spirits of the bells and their goblin attendants who reprimand him for losing faith in man's destiny to improve. He is told that he fell from the tower during his climb and is now dead, and Meg's subsequent life must now be an object lesson for him: he must "learn from the creature nearest to [his] heart" what pressures there are on the poor. There follows a series of visions which he is forced to watch, helpless to interfere with the troubled lives of Meg, Richard, Will and Lilian over the subsequent years. Richard descends into alcoholism; Meg eventually marries him in an effort to save him, but he dies ruined, leaving her with a baby. Will is driven in and out of prison by petty laws and restrictions; Lilian turns to prostitution and dies of grief. In the end, destitute, Meg is driven to contemplate drowning herself and her child, thus committing the mortal sins of murder and suicide. The chimes' intention is to teach Trotty that, far from being naturally wicked, mankind is formed to strive for nobler things, and will fall only when crushed and repressed beyond bearing. Trotty breaks down when he sees Meg poised to jump into the river, cries that he has learned his lesson and begs the Chimes to save her, whereupon he finds himself able to touch her and prevent her from jumping.

At the end of the book, Trotty finds himself awakening at home as if from a dream as the bells ring in the New Year of the day Trotty originally climbed the tower. Meg and Richard have chosen to wed, Will discovers that their kind landlady is the old family friend he was in search of and thus presumably he and Lilian will now be all right, and all of their friends have spontaneously chosen to provide a wedding feast and celebration. The author explicitly invites the reader to decide if this "awakening" is a dream-within-a-dream. The reader must choose between the harsh consequences of the behaviour of the upper classes in Trotty's vision, or the happiness of the wedding.

Main characters
 Toby "Trotty" Veck, the protagonist, a poor elderly messenger or "ticket-porter."
 Margaret "Meg" Veck, Toby's 21-year-old daughter
 Mrs. Anne Chickenstalker, the local shopkeeper
 Alderman Cute, a Justice of the Peace
 Mr. Filer, a political economist in the Utilitarian mould
 Sir Joseph Bowley, a rich paternalist MP
 Will Fern, a countryman
 Lilian Fern, Will's orphaned niece

Major themes
This is a campaigning story like its predecessor A Christmas Carol, written with the intention of swaying readers towards Dickens's moral message. The chimes represent time, and the main themes of the story are summarised in the three wrongs they accuse Trotty of committing:

 Harking back to a golden age that never was, instead of striving to improve conditions here and now.
 Believing that individual human joys and sorrows do not matter to a higher power.
 Condemning those who are fallen and unfortunate, and offering them neither help nor pity.

'Who turns his back upon the fallen and disfigured of his kind; abandons them as vile; and does not trace and track with pitying eyes the unfenced precipice by which they fell from good—grasping in their fall some tufts and shreds of that lost soil, and clinging to them still when bruised and dying in the gulf below; does wrong to Heaven and man, to time and to eternity. And you have done that wrong!'

Literary significance and reception
A Christmas Carol had been extremely well received the previous year, and The Chimes aroused public interest and anticipation. Five different stage productions of the book were running within weeks of publication and nearly 20,000 copies were sold in the first three months. It had a high media profile, and was widely reviewed and discussed. Critical opinion was divided; those sympathetic to its social and political message liked the book, but others thought it dangerously radical. The Northern Star reviewer called Dickens "the champion of the poor"; John Bull rejected his unflattering caricatures of philanthropy. It was certainly a financial success for Dickens, and remained popular for many years, although in the long term its fame was eclipsed by that of A Christmas Carol.

Allusions and references

Allusions to other works
Asking the upper classes to stop interfering with his life and leave him to die, Will Fern makes a bitter reference to the biblical Book of Ruth, deliberately misquoting Ruth's "Whither thou goest, I will go" speech.

Allusions to actual history, geography and current science
The novel's setting is contemporary and the 1840s (the "Hungry Forties") were a time of social and political unrest.

Trotty's conviction that poor people are naturally wicked is influenced by an article in his newspaper about a young woman who has tried to drown herself and her child, and this motif returns at the climax of the book, when Meg is driven to contemplate the same course of action. This is a reference to Mary Furley, a destitute young woman sentenced to death in 1844 for infanticide after her desperation not to return to the workhouse led to a suicide attempt in which her child drowned. This case caused great public debate in the late spring of 1844. Dickens took part in the general outcry against the sentence, which was eventually commuted to transportation. Among other works inspired by the Furley case is Thomas Hood's poem The Bridge of Sighs.

Alderman Cute is a parody of Sir Peter Laurie, a Middlesex magistrate, alderman and former Lord Mayor of London, known for his determination to "put down" the lower classes and their antisocial behaviour. His remarks on the 1844 Mary Furley case have been cited as one inspiration to Dickens to write The Chimes.

The unnamed young man who harks back to the "good old times" is a reference to the Young England movement. Dickens removed many of these references prior to publication.

Adaptations
In 1914, the book was made into a silent film, The Chimes, directed by Thomas Bentley.

A musical adaptation of The Chimes was created in 1992 by Lisa Kofod and Gay Donat Reed, with music by Paul Johnson. A staged reading of this work was produced at The Workhouse Theatre in New York City.

The Chimes was adapted into a 24-minute clay-animated film in 2000 by Xyzoo Animation. It won a Cine Special Jury award in 2002.

The Colonial Radio Theatre in Boston produced a full cast radio production of The Chimes in 2000. This was released on CD by Blackstone Audio in 2007, and re-released by Brilliance Audio in 2011.

In 2004, a stage adaptation by Les Smith premiered at the Southwark Playhouse.

In 2015, Audible issued The Chimes as a free audible book with Christmas well wishes from the company to its subscribers.

In 2022, Average Romp released The Chimes as a full-cast audio dramatisation starring Toby Jones as Toby Veck.

See also
 List of Christmas-themed literature

References

External links

Online editions
The Chimes at Internet Archive.

 

Film
Official film website
Theatre
 "The-Chimes.com"

1844 British novels
British novels adapted into films
British novels adapted into plays
Chapman & Hall books
Christmas novels
English novels
Fictional goblins
New Year celebrations
New Year novels
Novels adapted into radio programs
Novels by Charles Dickens
Novels set in London
Victorian novels